The Book of the Dead is an ancient Egyptian funerary text.

Book of the Dead or The Book of the Dead also may refer to:

Literature 
 Book of the Dead (Art Institute of Chicago), an Egyptian Book of the Dead papyrus scroll
 Bardo Thodol, traditionally but inaccurately called the "Tibetan Book of the Dead"
 Ethiopian Book of the Dead
 "Nekyia", Book 11 of the Odyssey
 Book of the Dead (anthology), a 1989 zombie horror anthology series
 Book of the Dead (memoir), E. Hoffman Price's collection of memoirs
 Book of the Dead (Cornwell novel), a crime novel written in 2007 by Patricia Cornwell
 The Book of the Dead (novel), the seventh book of the Agent Pendergast series and the third book of the Diogenes trilogy written by Douglas Preston and Lincoln Child
 The Book of the Dead (Lee), the third novel in The Secret Books of Paradys series by Tanith Lee
 Necronomicon, H.P. Lovecraft's fictional book
 Book of the Dead (Angel novel), a 2004 novel based on the U.S. television series Angel
 "The Book of the Dead", poem by American poet Muriel Rukeyser, published as Part 1 of her second volume, US 1 (1938)
 The QI Book of the Dead, the fourth tie-in book with the British television series QI
 Agrippa (A Book of the Dead), a poem by William Gibson
 Doktor Bey's Book of the Dead, 1981 by Derek Pell
 Left Ginza (part of the Ginza Rabba, the primary scripture of Mandaeism), also called the "Book of the Dead"

Other uses
 The Book of the Dead (film), a 2005 Japanese film
 Book of the Dead (album), an album by Bloodbound
 The Book of the Dead (album), a 1998 album by Ars Nova

See also 
 Totenpass, the "passport of the dead" in some ancient Greco-Roman religions